Udina is a volcanic massif located in the central part of the Kamchatka Peninsula, Russia. It comprises two conical stratovolcanoes: Bolshaya Udina (2,920 m) and Malaya Udina (1,945 m).

The basaltic Malaya Udina rises above a low saddle at the eastern end of the complex; small lava domes also occur on its flanks. This volcano is located within the Volcanoes of Kamchatka, a UNESCO World Heritage site.

The andesitic western volcano, Bolshaya Udina, has a prominent lava dome on its southwestern flank. Bolshaya Udina, long believed to be extinct, has shown signs of seismic unrest and was re-classified as 'active' in June 2019.

View

See also 
 List of volcanoes in Russia
 List of ultras of Northeast Asia

References

External links
 

Mountains of the Kamchatka Peninsula
Volcanoes of the Kamchatka Peninsula
Stratovolcanoes of Russia